Novy Byt is a rural locality (a khutor) and the administrative center of Novobytovskoye Rural Settlement, Nikolayevsky District, Volgograd Oblast, Russia. The population was 797 as of 2010. There are 17 streets.

Geography 
Novy Byt is located on Transvolga, on Caspian Depression, 73 km southeast of Nikolayevsk (the district's administrative centre) by road. Put Ilyicha is the nearest rural locality.

References 

Rural localities in Nikolayevsky District, Volgograd Oblast